The MVPA Awards are held by the Music Video Production Association, the trade organization for the American music video industry, since 1992. MVPA Awards honor the best music videos in a variety of aspects, which includes music video production and post-production companies, as well as individuals – directors, producers, cinematographers, choreographers, stylists, production designers, editors, colorists, animators and others.

References

External links
 

American music awards
Awards established in 1992